Gordon Leslie Proudfoot (19 November 1930 – 27 May 2022) was an Australian rules footballer who played with Fitzroy in the Victorian Football League (VFL).

Notes

External links 
		

1930 births
2022 deaths
Australian rules footballers from Victoria (Australia)
Fitzroy Football Club players
Frankston Bombers players